The Pigeon Tunnel: Stories from my Life is a memoir by British spy novelist John le Carré released on September 6, 2016. It remains the only feature length work of non-fiction in his bibliography. In the memoir, le Carré recounts stories reflecting on his time in British intelligence during the Cold War, research on his novels that took him around the globe (including an encounter with Yasser Arafat in Beirut in 1982 while researching The Little Drummer Girl), and his strained relationship with his father who influenced his semi-autobiographical novel A Perfect Spy.

Reception
The book received positive reviews from critics. In a positive review, The Guardian wrote that le Carré "remains a magician of plot and counter-plot, a master storyteller". The New York Times also praised the book as "a delightful collection of charming and occasionally insightful tales". Their reviewer also expressed hope that the book's climactic chapter, which focuses on his relationship with his father, be turned into a "profound John le Carré book."

References

2016 non-fiction books
John le Carré
British memoirs
Non-fiction books about espionage
Viking Press books